Bailey Scott (born 9 July 2000) is a professional Australian rules footballer playing for the North Melbourne Football Club in the Australian Football League (AFL).

Early life
Scott was born in Geelong. His father, Robert, was a professional footballer who played for Geelong and North Melbourne between 1986-2000. Robert played 245 games at the highest level and was a premiership player for the Kangaroos in 1996. At the age of nine, Bailey moved to Gold Coast, Queensland with his family and began playing junior football for the Broadbeach Cats. A talented junior footballer, Scott joined the Gold Coast Suns' Academy at the age of 12 while attending St Andrews Lutheran College.

In his final year of junior football, Scott was selected to captain the Gold Coast in the Academy Series and the Allies in the 2018 AFL Under 18 Championships. He was subsequently named in the All-Australian team for his performances in the national championships. In October 2018, he elected to be drafted by North Melbourne as a father-son selection, despite also having the option to join Geelong or Gold Coast. The Kangaroos drafted Scott with pick 49 in the 2018 AFL draft.

AFL career
Scott debuted for North Melbourne in round 1 of the 2019 AFL season. He won the Round 1 AFL Rising Star nomination in his debut, with 21 disposals and two goals.

References

External links

2000 births
Living people
North Melbourne Football Club players
Australian rules footballers from Queensland
Sportspeople from the Gold Coast, Queensland